Kim Min-kyu (born December 25, 1994), also spelled as Kim Min-gue, is a South Korean actor. He is known for his appearance in the variety program Crime Scene Season 3 and gained recognition for his roles in television series Queen: Love and War (2019-20), Backstreet Rookie (2020), Snowdrop (2021-22), and Business Proposal (2022).

Career 
Kim began his acting career in 2013, playing a minor role in Mnet drama Monstar, had notable roles in television series Signal (2016), Because This Is My First Life (2017), The Rich Son (2018) and Perfume (2019) and appeared in the variety program Crime Scene season 3 as an detective's assistant.

Kim gained recognition for his career's first leading role through the historical drama Queen: Love and War (2019-20) where he played Lee Kyung, the King of Joseon. In 2020, Kim played the role of Kang Ji-wook in SBS drama Backstreet Rookie.

In 2021, Kim appeared in So I Married the Anti-fan which premiered in April on Naver TV. Later the same year, he played Joo Gyeok-chan – a cold-hearted North Korean agent, in JTBC drama Snowdrop. In 2022, Kim starred in the SBS romantic comedy drama Business Proposal as chief secretary Cha Sung-hoon. Kim held an exhibition titled My Art, Your Art with graffiti artist M.Chat from June 10 to June 26, 2022.

Kim signed with Companion Company in February 2023. The same year, he stars in the tvN drama The Heavenly Idol in the title role as a K-pop idol  possessed by a priest from another dimension.

Personal life

Military service 
On November 25, 2022, it was confirmed that Kim would be enlisting in the military ahead of the premiere of his upcoming television series, in the first half of 2023.

Filmography

Film

Television series

Web series

Music video

Discography

Singles

Awards and nominations

References

External links 

 
 

Living people
1994 births
South Korean male models
South Korean male television actors
South Korean male film actors